Acetyl-CoA acetyltransferase, cytosolic, also known as cytosolic acetoacetyl-CoA thiolase, is an enzyme that in humans is encoded by the ACAT2  (acetyl-Coenzyme A acetyltransferase 2) gene

Acetyl-Coenzyme A acetyltransferase 2 is an acetyl-CoA C-acetyltransferase enzyme.

Gene
This gene shows complementary overlapping with the 3-prime region of the TCP1 gene in both mouse and human. These genes are encoded on opposite strands of DNA, as well as in opposite transcriptional orientation.

References

External links

Further reading 

 
 
 
 
 
 
 
 
 
 
 
 
 
 
 
 

Human proteins